Talladega County (pronounced Talla-dig-a) is one of the sixty-seven counties located in the east central portion of the U.S. state of Alabama. As of the 2020 census, the population was 82,149. Its county seat is Talladega.

Talladega County is included in the Talladega-Sylacauga, AL Micropolitan Statistical Area, which is also included in the Birmingham-Hoover-Talladega, AL Combined Statistical Area.

History
Prior to Euro-American settlement in this area, it was occupied by the Abihka tribe of the Creek Confederacy. The United States forced the Creek to agree to treaties by which they ceded their land to the US, ultimately resulting in Indian Removal to west of the Mississippi River, to Indian Territory.

Talladega County was established on December 18, 1832, from land ceded by the Creek Indians near the state's geographic center. The county seat was established at Talladega in 1834.

The name Talladega is derived from a Muscogee (Creek) Native American word Tvlvteke, from the Creek tålwa, meaning "town", and åtigi, or "border" -- "Border Town"—a town indicating its location on the boundary between the lands of the Creek tribe and those of the Cherokee and Chickasaw.

Geography
It is drained by Choccolocco Creek (archaic spelling: Chockolocko) and other streams. The county is located within the Coosa River Valley and the Ridge-and-Valley Appalachians, with the state's highest point, Mount Cheaha, being located on its northeastern border with Cleburne County.

Adjacent counties
 Calhoun County – north
 Cleburne County – northeast
 Clay County – east
 Coosa County – south
 Shelby County – southwest
 St. Clair County – northwest

National protected area
 Talladega National Forest (part)

Demographics

2000 census
As of the census of 2000, there were 80,321 people, 30,674 households, and 21,901 families living in the county. There were 34,469 housing units at an average density of 47 per square mile (18/km2). The racial makeup of the county was 67.02% White, 31.55% Black or African American, 0.23% Native American, 0.20% Asian, 0.02% Pacific Islander, 0.27% from other races, and 0.71% from two or more races. Nearly 1.01% of the population were Hispanic or Latino of any race.

In 2000, the largest ancestry groups in Talladega County were:
 English American 53%
 African American 32%
 Irish American 8.5%
 German American 6%
 Scottish American 2.4%
 Scots-Irish American 2.1%

There were 30,674 households, out of which 32.10% had children under the age of 18 living with them; 52.40% were married couples living together, 15.20% had a female householder with no husband present, and 28.60% were non-families. 25.90% of all households were made up of individuals, and 10.60% had someone living alone who was 65 years of age or older.  The average household size was 2.50, and the average family size was 3.00.

In the county, the population was spread out, with 25.00% under the age of 18, 9.00% from 18 to 24, 28.80% from 25 to 44, 23.90% from 45 to 64, and 13.30% who were 65 years of age or older.  The median age was 37 years. For every 100 females, there were 95.70 males.  For every 100 females age 18 and over, there were 93.50 males.

The median income for a household in the county was $31,628, and the median income for a family was $38,004. Males had a median income of $30,526 versus $21,040 for females. The per capita income for the county was $15,704.  About 13.90% of families and 17.60% of the population were below the poverty line, including 24.70% of those under age 18 and 18.20% of those age 65 or over.

2010 census
As of the census of 2010, there were 82,291 people, 31,890 households, and 22,191 families living in the county. There were 37,088 housing units at an average density of 50 per square mile (19/km2). The racial makeup of the county was 65.3% White, 31.7% Black or African American, 0.3% Native American, 0.4% Asian, 0.0% Pacific Islander, 1.0% from other races, and 1.3% from two or more races. Nearly 2.0% of the population were Hispanic or Latino of any race.

There were 31,890 households, out of which 27.8% had children under the age of 18 living with them; 47.2% were married couples living together, 17.5% had a female householder with no husband present, and 30.4% were non-families. 26.7% of all households were made up of individuals, and 10.1% had someone living alone who was 65 years of age or older. The average household size was 2.48, and the average family size was 2.98.

In the county, the population was spread out, with 23.4% under the age of 18, 8.6% from 18 to 24, 25.8% from 25 to 44, 28.1% from 45 to 64, and 14.1% who were 65 years of age or older. The median age was 39.3 years. For every 100 females, there were 94.9 males. For every 100 females age 18 and over, there were 98.1 males.

The median income for a household in the county was $36,948, and the median income for a family was $44,695. Males had a median income of $38,430 versus $27,404 for females. The per capita income for the county was $18,713. About 15.3% of families and 18.4% of the population were below the poverty line, including 27.1% of those under age 18 and 15.7% of those age 65 or over.

2020 census

As of the 2020 United States census, there were 82,149 people, 30,602 households, and 20,515 families residing in the county.

Government

The county is a Republican stronghold. However, Doug Jones, in his 2017 bid for the Senate managed to flip the county Democratic, likely due to sexual misconduct allegations against his opponent, Roy Moore. However, Donald Trump nevertheless won the county by wide margins against Hillary Clinton and Joe Biden in the 2016 and 2020 presidential elections respectively.

Education
Talladega County Schools is the local school district.

The Birmingham Supplementary School Inc. (BSS, バーミングハム日本語補習校 Bāminguhamu Nihongo Hoshūkō), a part-time Japanese school, has its office at the Honda Manufacturing of Alabama, LLC facility in unincorporated Talladega County, near Lincoln. It holds its classes at the Shelby-Hoover campus of Jefferson State Community College in Hoover. The school first opened on September 1, 2001.

Transportation

Major highways

 Interstate 20
 U.S. Highway 78
 U.S. Highway 231
 U.S. Highway 280
 State Route 21
 State Route 34
 State Route 76
 State Route 77
 State Route 148
 State Route 202
 State Route 235
 State Route 275

Rail
CSX Transportation
Norfolk Southern Railway
Amtrak
Eastern Alabama Railway

Communities

Cities
Childersburg
Lincoln
Oxford (part of Oxford is in Calhoun County)
Sylacauga
Talladega (county seat)

Towns
Bon Air
Munford
Oak Grove
Talladega Springs
Vincent (part of Vincent is in Shelby County and in St. Clair County)
Waldo

Census-designated places
Fayetteville
Mignon

Unincorporated communities

 Alpine
 Bemiston (neighborhood in Talladega)
 Chinnabee
 Curry
 Eastaboga (part of Eastaboga is in Calhoun County)
 Fishtrap
 Hopeful
 Kahatchie 
 Kentuck
 Laniers
 Liberty Hill
 Mardisville
 Old Eastaboga
 Renfroe
 Sycamore
 Winterboro

Ghost town
Gantts Quarry

See also
National Register of Historic Places listings in Talladega County, Alabama
Properties on the Alabama Register of Landmarks and Heritage in Talladega County, Alabama

References

External links
Talladega County official website
County community website
 Talladega County map of roads/towns (map © 2007 Univ. of Alabama)

 

Alabama placenames of Native American origin
 
1832 establishments in Alabama
Populated places established in 1832
Counties of Appalachia
Micropolitan areas of Alabama